The NBC superhero serial drama series Heroes follows the lives of people across the globe who possess various superhuman powers as they struggle to cope with their everyday lives and prevent foreseen disasters from occurring. The third season premiered on September 22, 2008, and was released on DVD on September 1, 2009. 

Within the seasons of Heroes are "volumes", which allow the writers to focus on shorter story arcs. The third season comprised 25 episodes that aired in two blocks generally without reruns. The first 13 episodes of the season made up the third volume, Villains, and the final 12 comprise the fourth volume, Fugitives. The season premiered on September 22, 2008 in the United States on NBC and on Global in Canada, with a one-hour clip-show and two regular episodes. The DVD and Blu-ray were released on September 1, 2009 in the United States and Canada.

Plot
"Villains", the season's first volume, began with the assassination attempt on Nathan Petrelli (Adrian Pasdar) by Peter Petrelli (Milo Ventimiglia) from the future, and explores its consequences. In addition, several villains with abilities escape from the Company's prisons. Some of them join forces with Arthur Petrelli (Robert Forster) (Peter's and Nathan's father) at Pinehearst Company, who wants to find a formula that gives ordinary people abilities in order to make the world a better place. Character arcs involve Tracy Strauss (Ali Larter) discovering her origins, Sylar (Zachary Quinto) trying to decide his loyalties, Peter losing his ability, Mohinder Suresh (Sendhil Ramamurthy) giving himself an ability, and Hiro Nakamura's (Masi Oka) discovery of a family secret.

The second part of season three, titled "Fugitives", involves what happens after Nathan fails to produce the formula. After the destruction of Primatech and Pinehearst, the heroes attempt to lead normal lives until Nathan tells the President of the United States (Michael Dorn) about people with abilities, and runs a government force, headed by Emile Danko (Željko Ivanek), to round them up. Micah Sanders (Noah Gray-Cabey), posing as "Rebel", starts to help people with abilities hide from the government. Meanwhile, Sylar searches for his father (John Glover).

Cast and characters

Main characters
Milo Ventimiglia as Peter Petrelli
Adrian Pasdar as Nathan Petrelli
Jack Coleman as Noah Bennet
Sendhil Ramamurthy as Mohinder Suresh
Cristine Rose as Angela Petrelli
Zachary Quinto as Sylar
Hayden Panettiere as Claire Bennet
James Kyson Lee as Ando Masahashi
Masi Oka as Hiro Nakamura 
Greg Grunberg as Matt Parkman
Ali Larter as Tracy Strauss
Dania Ramirez as Maya Herrera

Recurring characters

Episodes

Reception
Season three of Heroes started with strong ratings that dropped steadily throughout the season. The season's finale placed last in its timeslot.

This season was met with mixed to negative reception with most criticism directed towards the storylines, writing and characters.

Home media
The Season 3 DVD Box set was released in North America on September 1, 2009, and in Australia on September 2, 2009 with an alternative cover, and in the UK on October 12, 2009.

References

03
2008 American television seasons
2009 American television seasons